Homa-ye Bala may refer to:
 Homag-e Bala
 Homay-e Olya
 Tutang